Collyweston Slate Mine is a  geological Site of Special Scientific Interest  Northamptonshire. It is a Geological Conservation Review site.

This slate mine was operated until 1963, quarrying Collyweston slate, which dates to the Jurassic. The shaft exposes a section described by Natural England as  "stratigraphically important", and it is the type locality for the slate.

The site is private land with no public access.

References

Sites of Special Scientific Interest in Northamptonshire
Geological Conservation Review sites